Bureau of Immigration may refer to:

Bureau of Immigration (India)
Bureau of Immigration (Philippines)
Bureau of Immigration and Naturalization (Liberia)
Bureau of Immigration and Customs Enforcement, United States
A predecessor agency of the United States Immigration and Naturalization Service